, sometimes abbreviated , is a Japanese manga series written and illustrated by Natsuki Takaya. It was serialized in the semi-monthly Japanese  manga magazine , published by Hakusensha, from 1998 to 2006. The series' title comes from the name of a popular game played in Japanese elementary schools, which is alluded to in the series.

Fruits Basket tells the story of Tohru Honda, an orphan girl who, after meeting Yuki, Kyo, and Shigure Sohma, learns that 13 members of the Sohma family are possessed by the animals of the Chinese zodiac and are cursed to turn into their animal forms when they are weak, stressed, or when they are embraced by anyone of the opposite sex who is not possessed by a spirit of the zodiac. As the series progresses, Tohru learns of the hardships and pain faced by the afflicted members of the Sohma family, and through her own generous and loving nature, helps heal their emotional wounds. As she learns more about Yuki, Kyo, and the rest of the mysterious Sohma family, Tohru also learns more about herself and how much others care for her.

Takaya began a sequel titled Fruits Basket Another in September 2015, and the spin-off series The Three Musketeers Arc in April 2019. The original manga was first adapted into a 26-episode anime television series in 2001, by Studio Deen and directed by Akitaro Daichi. A second anime television series adaptation, produced by TMS Entertainment and directed by Yoshihide Ibata, premiered from April 2019, with its first season airing from April to September 2019, its second season airing from April to September 2020, and its third and final season airing from April to June 2021. The reboot anime series was initially a co-production of Funimation, who released the series through a partnership with Crunchyroll, although the series would later be completely moved under the latter.  A compilation film titled Fruits Basket: Prelude premiered theatrically in Japan in February 2022, and was released theatrically in the United States and Canada in June 2022 and in the United Kingdom in July 2022.

As of December 2018, the manga had over 30 million copies in circulation, making it one of the best-selling manga series, as well as one of the best-selling shōjo manga series of all time. It has been described in academic works as "a classic fan favorite in shoujo manga around the world".

Plot 

When high school student Tohru Honda's mother dies in a car accident, Tohru decides to live with her grandfather. Renovations on the house and an unsupportive, unkind family member cause her to move out of her grandfather's house temporarily. Tohru declines the offer to stay with one of her two close friends as she does not want to impose on them. Since she has nowhere else to go, Tohru begins living in a tent and supporting herself.

However, after discovering a nearby home inhabited by her popular classmate Yuki Sohma and his cousin Shigure, and following a landslide that destroys her tent, Tohru moves into the Sohma house; on her first day living there, she meets Kyo, Yuki and Shigure's orange-haired cousin, who crashes through the ceiling and challenges Yuki to a fight.

Kyo is possessed by the cat who was excluded from the zodiac, and is cursed to be similarly bullied and abused by the clan.

When Tohru discovers the Sohma family secret, she promises not to tell anyone, and is allowed to keep living with them. Although the Sohma curse stretches far deeper and darker than Tohru initially thinks, her presence and her acceptance of them soon becomes a large, positive influence on those possessed by the zodiac. She sets out to break the curse and, on the way, meets and discovers the Sohma's vengeful zodiac spirits, including their leader, Akito, who occupies the position of "God" in the Chinese legend, and who both keeps the family together and chains them to their spirits.

Production
The title of the series is taken from a children's game, in which the participants sit in a circle, and the leader of the game names each person after a type of fruit; when the name of a child's fruit is called, that child gets up and has to find a new seat. When the protagonist, Tohru Honda, first plays this game in kindergarten, she is not given a fruit, and is instead assigned "" by her classmates, who do not want her to play. However, Tohru, thinking that  are delicious, does not realise that her classmates are intentionally leaving her out of the game; once the game is finished, and all of the children but Tohru have been called, Tohru realizes that  are not a type of fruit at all, and she realizes that she does not belong.

Tohru comes to associate this game with the Sohma family, and that she does not fit in among them any more than an  does in a basket of fruit. In volume 1 of the manga, after Yuki and Kyo bring Tohru home from her grandfather's house, she begins to feel like she belongs with the Sohma family; after this, she imagines herself as a child hearing  called in the game, symbolizing that she has finally found her place.

Natsuki Takaya named most of the twelve Sohmas cursed by zodiac animals after archaic names of month in the former Japanese lunisolar calendar that correspond to their zodiac animal. The exceptions are Kureno and Momiji, whose names were swapped by mistake; Kyo, as the cat, is not part of the official zodiac, and so does not follow these naming conventions. Yuki's name also does not follow this naming convention, since Takaya came up with it before deciding the other names.

Publication

Main series

These were collected into 23  volumes, released from 19 January 1999 to 19 March 2007. The 12th and last volume was published on 20 July 2016.

The series is licensed in English in North America and the United Kingdom by Tokyopop and in Singapore by Chuang Yi. The Singapore edition is licensed to be imported to Australia and New Zealand by Madman Entertainment. All 23 English-language volumes have been released in North America and Singapore. In addition, Tokyopop released a box set containing the first four volumes in October 2007, and started re-releasing earlier volumes in "Ultimate Editions" combining two sequential volumes in a single larger hard-cover volume with new cover art. The first Ultimate Edition release met with mixed reviews, however, because they exactly reproduce the first two volumes without correcting changed page numbers or prior errors. As of June 2008, six Ultimate Editions have been released, covering the first twelve volumes of the series. After Tokyopop ceased publication, the series was re-licensed by Yen Press, with plans to release it as twelve omnibus editions corresponding Hakusensha's collector's editions. Starting in June 2016, Fruits Basket: Collector's Edition was released in English by Yen Press.

Spin-offs

On 4 September 2015, a new series, began serialization in HanaLaLaOnline. In August 2017, it was transferred to Manga Park. Originally, it was announced that Fruits Basket another would be finished on 3 December 2018, however, in March 2020, it was announced that the series would return with "chapter 13" (split in three parts) on 20 April 2020 (originally scheduled for 6 April). The second part of "chapter 13" was published on 4 May 2020 and the third part of "chapter 13" was published in September 2020, and Takaya announced that this would be "tentatively" the last chapter of the manga. The first collected volume was published on 19 August 2016. The series finished with its fourth volume, released on 18 February 2022. In November 2017, Yen Press announced the acquisition of the manga.

A "2nd season" began on 20 April 2020. The second chapter was published on 20 June. The third and final chapter was published on 5 August 2020. The chapters were collected in the fourth volume of Fruits Basket Another. Yen Press digitally simulpublished the series. The chapters were published on 23 April 6 June and 9 July 2019. The first chapter of Fruits Basket: The Three Musketeers Arc 2 was published on 28 April 2020. The second chapter was published on 22 June 2020. The third chapter was published on 5 August 2020.

Related media

Anime

First series (2001)

Directed by Akitaro Daichi, the twenty-six episode Fruits Basket anime series was animated by Studio Deen and produced by NAS and TV Tokyo. It premiered on TV Tokyo on 5 July 2001, with the final episode airing on 27 December 2001. Some parts of the plot deviated from the manga and were portrayed differently, such as Momiji and Shigure's mannerisms. Throughout production, Daichi and Takaya ran into disagreements, including the cast, coloring details, and Daichi's storytelling style, leading to Takaya disliking the series. The opening and ending themes were performed by Ritsuko Okazaki. The second ending theme is "Serenade" (performed by Daphne Gere in the English dub).

The series was released in Japan in nine individual DVD volumes by King Records, with each volume containing three episodes except for the first volume, which contained two. The first volume was released on 29 September 2001, with subsequent volumes released on a monthly basis until the final volume was released on 22 May 2002. A series box set was released on 25 April 2007, containing all twenty-six episodes, as well a message card from Natsuki Takaya, a 60-page deluxe booklet, and a bonus Fruits Basket CD soundtrack.

Funimation aired the series with their English dub on the Funimation Channel as well as on Colours TV and also licensed it for Region 1 DVD release. It released it in the form of four individual volumes containing 6-7 episodes and a complete series box set. On 20 November 2007, Funimation re-released the series as part of their lower priced Viridian line, with the new release containing the complete series in a thin-packed box set, and then on 1 August 2017 on an upscaled Blu-ray in a standard and collector's edition. In the United Kingdom, Funimation originally distributed the series through MVM Entertainment, but then changed distributors in November 2006 to Revelation Films. Revelation re-released the four individual volumes under their label. They also released the series box set on 22 January 2007. MVM re-licensed the series in late 2011. In Region 4, the series was released as a complete series box set by Madman Entertainment on 15 October 2003.

Second series (2019)

A new anime adaptation was announced in November 2018. The new adaptation would start in April 2019, and would adapt the entire manga. It features a new cast and staff, as per Takaya's request, with TMS Entertainment handling the production. Yoshihide Ibata is directing the series, with Taku Kishimoto handling series composition and Masaru Shindou handling character designs. The first season ran for 25 episodes from 6 April to 21 September 2019 on TV Tokyo, TV Osaka, and TV Aichi. The first opening theme for episodes 1-13 is "Again" by Beverly. The second opening theme for episodes 14-25 is "Chime" by Ai Otsuka. The first ending theme for episodes 1-13 is "Lucky Ending" by Vickeblanka. The second ending theme for episodes 14-25 is "One Step Closer" by INTERSECTION.

A second season aired from 7 April to 22 September 2020. The third opening theme for episodes 26-38 is "Prism" by AmPm ft Miyuna. The fourth opening theme for episodes 39 onwards is "Home" by Toki Asako. The third ending theme for episodes 26-38 is "ad meliora (acoustic mix)" by THE CHARM PARK. The fourth ending theme for episodes 39 onwards is "Eden" by Monkey Majik.

A third and final season, titled Fruits Basket: The Final, aired from 6 April to 29 June 2021.  The fifth opening theme is "Pleasure", by WARPs UP, and the fifth ending theme is "Haru Urara" by GENIC.

The reboot is a co-production of Funimation, who released the series through Crunchyroll-Funimation partnership. Mighty Media has licensed the series in Asia-Pacific, and is streaming it on Netflix and Animax Asia. Funimation has also licensed the series for home video distribution. The English dub features many of the English voice actors that voiced in the first Fruits Basket series. Crunchyroll streamed the English-subtitled version, while Funimation streamed the English-dubbed version. Episodes 9 and 10 were temporarily delayed internationally due to the French Open tennis tournament coverage in Japan. In March 2020, Funimation announced that the SimulDub production would be delayed internationally due to the COVID-19 Pandemic, starting with episode 4 of season 2. The SimulDub's was later resumed as scheduled starting with Season 3. Although the series was initially produced under the Crunchyroll-Funimation partnership, following Sony's acquisition of Crunchyroll, the series was fully moved under Crunchyroll.

Funimation's English dub of the anime began airing in Australia on ABC Me on 19 June 2020.

Compilation film (2022)

The 2019 series received a compilation film titled Fruits Basket: Prelude, which premiered theatrically in Japan on 18 February 2022. It recaps the 2019 anime series, and includes a prequel episode titled Kyо̄ko to Katsuya no Monogatari that focuses on Tohru's parents, and an original story written by Takaya set after the series. The film's theme song is "Niji to Kite" ("Rainbow and Kite") by Ohashi Trio. The film had a 3-day theatrical release with both a subbed and a dubbed version starting on 25 June 2022 in the United States and Canada, and ran on 25 June 28 June, and 29 June respectively. Additionally, the film had a 1-day release with the English dub only in the United Kingdom on 20 July 2022. Crunchyroll distributed both versions.

Other media
In 1999, the magazine  released a special Fruits Basket drama CD which had a four-chapter original story and short talk sections between each section. Released before the anime came out, this CD had a completely different voice cast. The CD was a promotional item with a limited run and is now unavailable. As well as the drama CD, there have been two music CD releases of Fruits Basket to coincide with the anime adaptation, Memory for You and Four Seasons (also known as Song for ).

Natsuki Takaya has created one art book and two fan books for Fruits Basket. The art book, containing 101 pages of illustrations, was published by Hakusensha on 16 April 2004. The first fan book, which contained 192 pages of story summaries, character biographies, and activities, was published in Japan on 19 May 2005. Tokyopop released it in English on 11 September 2007. The second fan book, was published in Japan on 19 March 2007 and contained 187 pages; it was scheduled to be published in English by Tokyopop on 27 April 2010.

Fruits Basket has also resulted in the creation of a variety of merchandise, including plushies of the various zodiac animals, wall calendars, clothing items, key chains, wall scrolls, buttons, figurines, and school supplies. A collectible card game based on the series was also created and published by Score Entertainment which can be used for playing  as well as other games. On 5 July 2022, during Anime Expo 2022, Crunchyroll announced that the series would get a collaboration with the famous Hello Kitty franchise, which debuted in August 2022

In 2008, the all-male theatrical troupe Gekidan Studio Life announced it would be producing a theatrical adaptation of Fruits Basket, using only performers who would be making their stage debuts. The production ran for two weeks at the Galaxy Theater in Tokyo starting 25 February 2009. Another stage play adaptation titled Fruits Basket The Stage ran in 2022 starting from 4 March at Tokyo's Nihonbashi Mitsui Hall. A sequel to the stage play has been announced, and is set to run sometime in 2023.

Reception

Manga
The Fruits Basket manga series is one of the top manga series in both Japan and in the US. More than 18 million copies have been sold in Japan, and 30 million copies worldwide. It is Tokyopop's best selling manga series, with more than 2 million copies sold as of 2006. The fifteenth volume of the English release rose to the 15th position on the USA Today Top 150 Bestselling Books, which is the highest position ever achieved by a volume of manga in the United States. The eighteenth volume debuted at the top of the Nielsen BookScan sales list, while the nineteenth volume was the second bestselling graphic novel in March 2008. Despite a slow manga market, Fruits Basket remained the second highest overall selling manga series among the Bookscan companies in 2007. The final volume of the English adaptation was a New York Times manga bestseller from 28 June through 25 July, moving from #2 to #1 in the list in the week of 19–25 July. The volume dropped back down to second place the following week, then dropped to 4th place in the week of 8 August. The final volume remained on the best seller list for 12 weeks.

The Fruits Basket manga received the 2001 Kodansha Manga Award in the shōjo manga category and the "Best Manga" award at the 2007 American Anime Awards. In 2001, the Fruits Basket anime won an Animage Anime Grand Prix award.

Critics have praised the overall story in Fruits Basket as being intellectual, with even the relatively light-hearted first volume giving hints at something darker in the background that makes the reader "question everything that happens." Some felt the series was getting close to overloading readers with angst in later volumes, and questioned the credulity of the sheer number of bad parents in the series. As one reviewer noted: "in the world of Fruits Basket, good parents are as common as penguins in the Sahara—every single one is either neglectful, smothering, unfeeling, abusive, misguided, or dead."

Takaya's artwork in particular has been praised by critics, with Takaya's skills in detailed art, shadowing, and shading lauded as able to convey the character's moods and emotions without the character having any dialogue at all.

In Manga: The Complete Guide, Jason Thompson gave the manga three and a half out of four stars. While finding the series to be "surprisingly sad" and praising the well-defined characters, he felt the series was "neither particularly well drawn nor incredibly witty". As a whole, he considered it "a fascinating manga, like a sweet, melancholy dream." A factor in the success of Fruits Basket in English-speaking countries was that the books were being sold in bookstores, rather than comic book shops, which are considered to be a predominantly male domain.

Anime
The first Fruits Basket anime adaptation has also been well received, ranking third in Anihabara's list of top televised anime series in Japan for February 2002. In the June 2002 issue of Animage magazine, the series was first in a list of the best twenty anime series in Japan. In 2006, five years after the series finished airing in Japan, it was 93rd in TV Asahi's list of Japan's 100 favorite animated TV series. Animerica reviewers felt the anime adaptation was similar to Ranma ½ in terms of premise and its using a similar musical score. Julie Davis found the characters to be "superficially pretty" and "so-clean-they-look-almost-like-paper-cutouts" with "really, really gigantic eyes", though she notes that the animal alter forms of the zodiac members were "cute and cuddly". Fellow reviewer Urian Brown disagreed, stating that "the characters are designed in a sleek stylish manner that is classy" and felt the animation was "refined". Though it only covers part of the manga, critics felt the ending brought the story to a good stopping point while making it clear that there was much left for the Sohma and Tohru to deal with, including the curse and Tohru's future choice between Kyo and Yuki. Though some felt the plot was lacking in development, they also praised the series for the strength of its character relationships. Allen Divers of Anime News Network called the series a "true emotional roller coaster" which hides "truly deep and heartfelt drama" behind humor, adding that the show explores many "aspects of emotion."

In April 2005, Funimation Entertainment started a project calling for convention attendees to help them fold 1,000 origami paper cranes. In Japanese folklore, folding 1,000 paper cranes would grant someone a wish. When they had at least 1,000 cranes, Funimation sent the cranes and pictures of the events to Studio Deen and Hakusensha to try to convince the company to produce a second season of the Fruits Basket anime. Fans successfully folded the required 1,000 cranes by the end of the 2005 convention season, starting at least a 13-year gap that culminated in the announcement of the new Fruits Basket anime in 2018.

The 2019 version has also received positive reception. Thrillist listed the 2019 Fruits Basket series among the best anime of the 2010s. In February 2022, Fruits Basket: The Final won the 'Anime of the Year' award during the 8th Anime Trending Awards.

References

Further reading

External links

Manga
 Official Hakusensha Fruits Basket manga site 
 Official Tokyopop Fruits Basket English manga site
 Official Chuang Yi Fruits Basket English manga site
 

Anime
 Official TV Tokyo Fruits Basket anime site 
 Official Funimation Fruits Basket anime site
  
 
 
 

 
1999 manga
2001 anime television series debuts
2001 Japanese television series endings
2019 anime television series debuts
2020 anime television series debuts
2021 anime television series debuts
Animated television series about dysfunctional families
Animated television series about orphans
Anime series based on manga
Chinese mythology in anime and manga
Fiction about shapeshifting
Crunchyroll anime
Hakusensha franchises
Hakusensha manga
Madman Entertainment anime
Madman Entertainment manga
Male harem anime and manga
Romantic comedy anime and manga
School life in anime and manga
Shōjo manga
Studio Deen
Supernatural anime and manga
TMS Entertainment
Tokyopop titles
TV Tokyo original programming
Winner of Kodansha Manga Award (Shōjo)
Yen Press titles